Noel Harrington (born 24 December 1970) is a former Irish Fine Gael politician who served as a Teachta Dála (TD) for the Cork South-West constituency from 2011 to 2016.

He was a member of Cork County Council for the Bantry local electoral area from 1999 to 2011.

Between his election to the Dáil at the February 2011 general election and the last day of December 2011, he claimed expenses of €53,714. This was the highest expenses claimed by any TD in this period and was nearly €1,000 more than his nearest rival, while he lived further away from Leinster House than any other TD.

He lost his seat at the 2016 general election.

References

 

1970 births
Living people
Fine Gael TDs
Local councillors in County Cork
Members of the 31st Dáil
Politicians from County Cork